The 1984 Cotton Bowl Classic was the 48th edition of the college football bowl game, played at the Cotton Bowl in Dallas, Texas, on Monday, January 2. Part of the 1983–84 bowl game season, it matched the undefeated and second-ranked Texas Longhorns of the Southwest Conference (SWC) and the #7 Georgia Bulldogs of the Southeastern Conference (SEC). Underdog Georgia rallied with a late touchdown to win, 10–9.

New Year's Day was on Sunday in 1984, and the major college bowl games were played the following day.

Teams

Georgia

The Bulldogs tied Clemson on the road in September, and lost at home to Auburn in November. That win also gave Auburn the SEC championship and an automatic berth to the Sugar Bowl . It was Georgia's third appearance in the Cotton Bowl.

Texas

The Longhorns had won all eleven games and had a regular season winning streak of seventeen games.

Game summary
Televised by CBS, the game kicked off shortly after 12:30 p.m. CST, as did the Fiesta Bowl on NBC.

Texas drove deep on its first possession, but settled for a 22-yard field goal by Jeff Ward. Georgia's Kevin Butler made one from 43 yards to tie the game in the closing seconds of the first quarter. The second quarter was scoreless.

Ward added six more points with two more field goals of 40 and 27 yards in the third quarter, and Texas led 9–3 with less than five minutes to play. A Chip Andrews (Georgia) muffed punt by Texas defensive back Craig Curry late in the fourth quarter allowed Georgia quarterback John Lastinger to run 17 yards for a touchdown with 3:22 left to play to capture a 10–9 victory. The loss was the first for the Longhorns, costing them a possible national title.

Scoring
First quarter
Texas - Jeff Ward 22-yard field goal
Georgia - Kevin Butler 43-yard field goal
Second quarter
No scoring
Third quarter
Texas - Ward 40-yard field goal
Texas - Ward 27-yard field goal
Fourth quarter
Georgia - John Lastinger 17-yard run (Butler kick)

Statistics
{| class=wikitable style="text-align:center"
! Statistics !!  Georgia  !! Texas
|-
| First Downs || 13 || 14
|-
| Yards Rushing|| 45–149|| 47–110
|-
| Yards Passing || 66|| 168
|-
| Passing || 6–20–1 || 8–26–2
|-
| Total Offense || 65–215|| 73–278
|-
|Punts–Average ||9–41|| 7–46
|-
|Fumbles–Lost ||2–1|| 4–2
|-
|Turnovers ||2|| 4
|-
|Penalties–Yards ||3–25|| 6–52
|-
|Time of possession || 29:41 || 30:19
|}

Aftermath
That night in the Orange Bowl, the #5 Miami Hurricanes upset top-ranked Nebraska, 31–30. Miami moved past Nebraska and the Longhorns to secure their first national championship. Georgia climbed to fourth in the final AP poll, and Texas fell to fifth.

References

Cotton Bowl Classic
Cotton Bowl Classic
Georgia Bulldogs football bowl games
Texas Longhorns football bowl games
Cotton Bowl Classic
January 1984 sports events in the United States